Hebeloma syrjense is a species of mushroom in the family Hymenogastraceae.  It has been noted to grow at the sites of decomposing bodies at the body farm in Tennessee.

References

Fungi described in 1879
Fungi of North America
stenocystis